Army Wives is a 1987 Australian television film directed by Denny Lawrence and starring Julie Nihill, Lian Lunson, Shane Connor, and Philip Quast. The plot is about two friends who marry soldiers in the army.

References

External links

Page on film at Philip Quast fan site
Army Wives at Oz Movies

Australian drama television films
1987 television films
1987 films
Films scored by Chris Neal (songwriter)
1980s English-language films